Robert Davidson (1876–1935) was a Scottish footballer who played in the Football League for Manchester City. He earlier played for Celtic, featuring on the losing side in the 1901 Scottish Cup Final and winning the 1902 British League Cup. After his spell in England, he made well over a century of appearances for Airdrieonians and came into consideration for an international appearance, taking part in the Home Scots v Anglo-Scots trial in 1905 (his side won 2–0, but ultimately Andy McCombie and Jimmy Watson were selected as the full-back pairing).

References

1876 births
1935 deaths
Scottish footballers
English Football League players
Scottish Football League players
Scottish Junior Football Association players
Association football defenders
Albion Rovers F.C. players
Dykehead F.C. players
Celtic F.C. players
Belfast Celtic F.C. players
Heart of Midlothian F.C. players
Airdrieonians F.C. (1878) players
Bathgate F.C. players
Manchester City F.C. players